Xerophloea is a genus of leafhoppers in the family Cicadellidae. There are about 13 described species in Xerophloea.

Species
These 13 species belong to the genus Xerophloea:

 Xerophloea breviceps Osborn 1935 c g
 Xerophloea cephalica Oman 1936 c g
 Xerophloea difformis Oman 1936 c g
 Xerophloea elegans Oman 1936 c g
 Xerophloea elongata Oman 1936 c g
 Xerophloea foveolata Fieber 1866 c g
 Xerophloea gigas Oman 1936 c g
 Xerophloea magna Oman 1936 c g
 Xerophloea majesta Lawson, 1931 c g b
 Xerophloea major Baker, 1898 c g b
 Xerophloea peltata b
 Xerophloea viridis (Fabricius, 1794) c g b
 Xerophloea zionis b

Data sources: i = ITIS, c = Catalogue of Life, g = GBIF, b = Bugguide.net

References

Further reading

External links

 

Ledrinae
Cicadellidae genera